State Route 146 (SR-146) was a state highway in the U.S. state of Utah that connected the city of Pleasant Grove with SR-92 at the mouth of American Fork Canyon, some  to the north in Utah County.

Route description
Route 146 started in Pleasant Grove at the intersection of 100 East and State Street US-89. Travelling north on 100 East, the route left Pleasant Grove, turned into Canyon Road, and traveled along the eastern foothills of Cedar Hills, Utah until it ended at the Alpine Loop Scenic Byway at the mouth of American Fork Canyon.

History
State Route 146 was first established in 1933, with its south end at US-89 (then known as Route 1, and later as Route 8) in Pleasant Grove, and its north end connecting with what was then SR-71 (now numbered SR-74) south of Alpine and west of the mouth of American Fork Canyon. SR-92 (then numbered SR-80) was established in 1935 and had its eastern terminus at SR-74, but in 1941 was extended east to the Uinta National Forest boundary in American Fork Canyon, replacing the  stretch of SR-146 between SR-74 and the mouth of the canyon.

SR-146 remained unchanged until 2014, when it was decommissioned in a jurisdictional transfer with Utah County. In exchange for the creation of State Route 129 along North County Boulevard, all of SR-146 was removed from the state highway system. The former route is now maintained by the Utah County Public Works department and is funded with county funds. The transfer was approved by the Utah Transportation Commission on December 5, 2014.

Major intersections

References

146
 146
American Fork, Utah
Streets in Utah